Alton L. (Pete) Becker (April 6, 1932 – November 15, 2011) was an American linguist known for his studies of Burmese grammar and other Southeast Asian languages, including Malaysian, Javanese and Kawi. He was a professor of linguistics at the University of Michigan from 1968 to 1986. Becker published studies in philology, rhetoric, and the ethnography of communication. He was coauthor with Richard E. Young and Kenneth L. Pike of the widely influential college writing textbook, Rhetoric: Discovery and Change, which introduced a Rogerian framework for communication and rhetoric studies as an alternative to the Aristotelian approach. To recognize his significant contributions and publications of translations from Southeast Asian languages to English, the Association for Asian Studies awards the annual A. L. Becker Prize to honor his significant contributions.

Life 

Becker was born in Monroe, Michigan. In Southeast Michigan, he often attended jazz performances in Detroit, and he also began a lifelong love of canoeing. He studied English literature at the University of Michigan, where he completed a Bachelor's degree in 1954. He married Judith Omans in 1953. He later attended the University of Connecticut, where earned a master's degree in 1956 and also taught.
From 1958 to 1961, he lived and worked in Taunggyi, Burma. He moved to Burma with his wife Judith and their son Matthew, and their son Andrew was born there. In Burma, he taught English at Kambawza College under the Fulbright program. He credited this experience in Burma and his study of Burmese for his change in scholarly interests from English literature to linguistics, particularly his work in language and culture, the ethnography of communication, and for his studies of Southeast Asian languages and ancient texts. He returned to Southeast Asia in 1969, when he held a two-year position teaching linguistics at the Universitas Negeri Malang, in Malang, Indonesia.

Academic career 

Becker taught at the University of Michigan from 1961 to 1986. From 1961 to 1968, prior to receiving the PhD, he taught English at Michigan while a graduate student under the direction of Kenneth L. Pike. He joined the Department of Linguistics at Michigan as assistant professor in 1968 and was named full professor in 1974. His course "Language and Culture" was particularly popular. At Michigan, Becker performed as a puppeteer with the university Gamelan.
Becker's writing about the Javanese wayang (shadow puppet play) was described as "brilliant." In his most well-known essay on the epistemology of the shadow play, he notes that the "neatly divided" visual aspects, musical aspects, and verbal aspects of the performance allow it to be appreciated by many, and Becker's essay makes the play relatable to "outsider" (non-Indonesian) audiences:
An outsider can watch a performance with real aesthetic involvement without knowing the language. The musical accompaniment by the gamelan is appealingly rich and complex. In many ways, a shadowplay can be understood as a silent movie, with a theatre orchestra playing in the pit. Foreigners watch Javanese shadowplays that way with real aesthetic satisfaction.
At the same time, connoisseurs can appreciate the linguistic registers of the dalang (puppeteer) who uses both ancient and modern languages, as well as Javanese and Indonesian, which allows for the plays to simultaneously "speak in the past" and "speak in the present." Becker's essay is the first to examine Indonesian thought and "text-building" through a lens of language and culture as epistemology.

Becker received numerous distinctions that recognized his academic contributions. Becker was Director of the Michigan Center for South and Southeast Asian Studies from 1972 to 1975. He was a senior fellow of the Michigan Society of Fellows from 1975 to 1978 and a scholar in residence at Princeton's Institute for Advanced Study in 1981–1982. He received the University of Michigan Press Book Award in 1995 for this book, recognized as the best book published in 1995 by the press. In 1996, a linguistics conference titled "The Notion of Person: A Conference to Honor the Work of Alton L. Becker" was held in his honor. His publications on semiotics, rhetoric, and the ethnography of communication have been widely influential in linguistics. Upon his death, the Association for Asian Studies established the AAS Southeast Asia Council (SEAC) A. L. Becker Southeast Asian Literature in Translation Prize in Becker's memory.

Scholarly works

Books and articles

Secondary texts

Links 
Memoir of A. L. Becker by the Regents of the University of Michigan, 1986
A. L. Becker entry on ArborWiki
Faculty Biography from University of Michigan Center for Southeast Asian Studies
Alton (Pete) Becker, Faculty History Project, University of Michigan 1817-2017

References 

1932 births
2011 deaths
People from Monroe, Michigan
Linguists from the United States
University of Michigan College of Literature, Science, and the Arts alumni
University of Michigan faculty
University of Michigan fellows
Princeton University fellows
Fulbright alumni